Statistics of American Soccer League II in season 1939–40.

Metropolitan Division

New England Division

First half

Second half

Playoffs

First half playoff
The Swedish-Americans and Lusitano S.C. ended the first half tied for first place. A playoff was held to determine the first half champions.

Final

Pawtucket wins, 3–1, on aggregate.

References

American Soccer League (1933–1983) seasons
Amer